No Way Back is a 1976 blaxploitation film written and directed by Fred Williamson, who also stars as Jesse Crowder, a private detective who once used to belong to a police force but that now finds himself taking odd jobs for a little extra money.

Synopsis 
Jesse Crowder is hired by the wife and brother of a fugitive named Woolf who is on the run because he had just robbed a bank. Woolf uses this money to embezzle it, where from Crowder decides to take the case and follows the fugitive from Los Angeles, California to San Francisco, California. Woolf is on the run with his girlfriend Candy. Crowder pursues his targets following small clues while causing a whole mess of trouble with a gangster named Bernie. Bernie is Candy's pimp and also the leader of a gang. When Bernie learns that Crowder is looking for one of his employees he makes sure that Crowder is taken care of. He sends numerous thugs in Crowder's direction but nonetheless Crowder manages to successfully capture Mrs. Pickens’ husband after fighting off a couple of Bernie's thugs but has yet to capture the girlfriend. Crowder's previous cop experience provided a helpful basis from which he was able to eventually pick up on her trail after having gotten himself into more trouble with Candy's pimp and his gang. A final showdown takes place in the desert in a blind haze of gunfire.

Cast 

 Fred Williamson as Jesse Crowder
 Charles Woolf as Mr. Pickens
 Tracy Reed as Candy
 Virginia Gregg as Mildred Pickens
 Stack Pierce as Bernie
 Argy Allen as Pickens' Brother
 Paula Sills as Crowder's Secretary
 Don Cornelius as Don Cornelius
 Nick Dimitri as Goon #1
 Gene LeBell as Goon #2
 Mike Henry as Goon #3
 William Kerwin as Goon #4

Crew 
Fred Williamson - Director, Producer, Screenwriter
Jeff Williamson - Producer
James E. Nownes - Editor
Oliver Moss - Sound/Sound Designer
Robert Caramico - Cinematographer

Analysis 
Jesse Crowder plays by his own rules and will do anything he can within his power to complete his mission, all that he needs to ensure that he does this is some cold hard cash. Besides a thirst for money Crowder also has a thirst for women. He is a ladies’ man as some would say, and is also a stereotypically strong African American man. Crowder is a strong black man, and makes sure that everyone around him knows this. This aspect of the movie may represent a sort of ironic situation in that Crowder boasts about his strength and physical prowess with the women, which are animal-like characteristics, yet also demands to be seen as more than just what the white man has made him out to be. Crowder often encounters many women whom he has sexual relations with shortly after meeting them. His slick lines and tough guy attitude sweeps the ladies right off their feet so that at the end of all of these sexual encounters the women are often seen begging for more sex. This stereotype was a common blaxploitation characteristic to use in African American films.

Distribution 
Atlas Films – The film was primarily targeted at African-Americans in suburban areas across the United States of America and to those primarily situated in western and eastern suburban areas.

Historical significance 
This film is part of a larger genre known as blaxploitation which emerged in the early 1970s in the time when many black exploitation films were being made specifically to target black audiences. No Way Back emerged as one of these blaxploitation films in 1976 and was set on the West Coast, which typically as many other blaxploitation films like it took place in the ghetto. This was a common characteristic of blaxploitation films which accentuated crime, drug deals, and pimps. Another important aspect of this particular movie is the pun with the name Jesse Crowder which plays on Jim Crow Laws, an important and controversial aspect of earlier African American life. Only a little over a decade before the film was made it had actually been legal to segregate black and whites in public institutions as well as in other places in society (this play on words is prevalent in blaxploitation films) These laws eventually led to one of the greatest court decisions in this country's history known as Brown v. Board of Education in which the Warren Court held that separate but equal learning facilities was unconstitutional and therefore overturned the previous court decision of Plessy v. Ferguson.

Aside from the main characters name the other characters names also have a great deal of importance. The fugitive for example possesses a strong white American name, Henry, yet in this movie the man with the white name is portrayed as the bad guy, and the source of all the corruption and greed in the world. His surname is coincidentally Pickens, which could be associated with the hard labor that slaves had to do before Fred Williamson's time. It also brings to mind all of the hardships which were faced during the time of slavery, as well as the slightly improving segregation period of American History. The film also works on a secondary level, which is in the subjugation of women. This element is evident in the film when Crowder has sexual relations with some women throughout the movie. These women are often left begging for more sex which was the foundation of many blaxploitation films. This of course leads to anti-women sentiments as one of the movie’s catchphrases is "Never trust a woman with her clothes off!" Another of this films quotes is “You pay the bill. I’ll deliver it, legal, illegal, moral or otherwise!” This is symbolic of the economic situations which had been crippling the culture of the United States. This was in part because major companies were committing crimes, were employing policies of segregation, and were able to get away with it because of their favorable financial situations. This powerful quote also demonstrates the ideology of the time and the stereotypes with which white American's described African Americans. Apart from being seen as inferior, African-Americans (as well as many other minorities) were seen as utter savages and because of this most Americans believed that they lacked the inability to distinguish between things that would be considered legal or illegal. One blaxploitation film that accentuates this barbarian belief is Spike Lee's Bamboozled.

An important event in this film which occurs fairly on in the films runtime is when Mr. Pickens robbed the bank and flees with the stolen money. He then chooses to embezzle that money which he had just stolen, which logically makes no sense at all, but if this event is thought of symbolically it could represent the ideals and thoughts of the culture of that time, which held that whites were notoriously corrupt individuals. It could also be thought of as an allusion to American companies which were committing countless numbers of crimes upon crimes, from not providing adequate working conditions to racism in the workplace to lynching and countless other immoral and unethical crimes.

Soundtrack 
This film consisted of three soundtracks from the album of the same name by The Dells:
West Virginia Symphony 
 When Does the Lovin' Start 
 I'll Make You My Girl 
 Life Is the Time 
 Ain't No Black and White in Music 
 No Way Back (from No Way Back) 
 Too Late for Love (from No Way Back) 
 You Are the Greatest 
 Adventure (from No Way Back) 
 I'll Try Again 
 Slow Motion 
 The album is not as popular as other blaxploitation scores but it does have a “nice hard funk theme with a heavy bass line and persistent riff start the second side, then a straightforward soulful love theme, and finally a great funky instrumental to finish the selection.”

References

External links 
 
 

1976 films
1970s action films
1976 crime drama films
American action films
American crime drama films
Blaxploitation films
American detective films
Films set in Los Angeles
Films set in San Francisco
Films directed by Fred Williamson
1970s English-language films
1970s American films